Demarre McGill is an American classical musician who is principal flutist of the Seattle Symphony. He is also one of the few African-American musicians who hold positions in professional orchestras.

Early life and education
McGill began playing the flute at age seven when his parents exposed him and his brother to music. He was educated at Curtis Institute of Music, studying under Julius Baker and Jeffrey Khaner. He later continued his studies with Baker at the Juilliard School, receiving a Masters of Music degree.

Career
In May 2012, McGill and his brother, Anthony McGill, performed the world premiere of Joel Puckett's Concerto Duo for Flute and Clarinet with the Chicago Youth Symphony Orchestra, the orchestra where they began their musical careers.

McGill has been the recipient of the Avery Fisher Career Grant, an award given every year to outstanding instrumentalists. His younger brother, Anthony, is the principal clarinet of the New York Philharmonic.

References

Living people
1975 births
American classical flautists
Musicians from Chicago
Classical musicians from Illinois
20th-century classical musicians
20th-century American musicians
20th-century American male musicians
21st-century classical musicians
21st-century American musicians
21st-century American male musicians
Curtis Institute of Music alumni
Juilliard School alumni
20th-century flautists
21st-century flautists